The Golden Gate is a novel written by the Scottish author Alistair MacLean.  It was first released in the United Kingdom by Collins in 1976 and later in the same year by Doubleday in the United States.

Plot
A team of criminals led by mastermind Peter Branson kidnaps the President of the United States and his two guests from the Middle East, a prince and a king, on San Francisco's Golden Gate Bridge, in a masterfully conceived and clockwork-timed operation. Branson and his men block off both ends of the bridge, wire it with explosives, and demand half a billion dollars and a full pardon for themselves. Any rescue attempts will result in the detonation of the explosives, which will kill the President (and his guests) and destroy the Golden Gate Bridge.

However, Branson is an egomaniac, and he cannot resist attention from the media. So he invites the press to stay on the bridge and cover the story. Aware that the FBI will have placed agents among them, he takes the precaution of searching them and removing the armed ones. However, Hagenbach (the FBI's dour but extremely adept head agent) has an ace in the hole: a hand-picked special agent, Paul Revson, who was equipped with only a camera. Allowed to remain on the bridge, Revson sets out to foil Branson's plans and rescue the President.

With the help of a doctor and a female journalist, Revson gets a message to his superiors, suggesting various courses of action: supplying drugged food to the terrorists, placing a submarine under the bridge, and trying to neutralize the terrorists' equipment with a laser beam. He also arranges for several carefully disguised weapons and gadgets to be smuggled to him. Working on both ends, Revson, Hagenbach, and those working with them unleash their own carefully conceived plans.

Cast of Characters
In the story, most of the good guys make their appearances after most of the bad guys, of whom there are 17:
 Peter Branson, a criminal mastermind and leader of the plot
 Van Effen, a skilled driver and Branson's right-hand man
 Chrysler, a communications and electronics expert
 Yonnie, a boxer
 Bartlett
 Reston, an explosives expert
 Harrison, an explosives expert
 Mack
 Johnson, a helicopter pilot
 Bradley, a helicopter pilot
 Giscard, who poses as a cop
 Parker, who poses as a cop
 Harriman, who poses as Jensen
 Kowalski, a Vietnam veteran
 Peters, a Vietnam veteran and medic (field corpsman)
 Bartlett
 Boyard

Opposing the villains are the following characters, many of whom are hostages:
 Paul Revson, an FBI agent and the hero
 April Wednesday, a fashion photographer and Revson's love interest
 O'Hare, a doctor and ambulance driver
 President of the United States, a prime hostage
 Richards, the Vice President of the United States
 King of Saudi Arabia, a prime hostage
 Iman, the oil minister of the King of Saudi Arabia and a prime hostage
 Prince Achmed, a prime hostage
 Kharan, the oil minister of Prince Achmed and a prime hostage
 Hansen, the US Secretary of Energy
 Milton, the US Secretary of State
 Quarry, the US Secretary of the Treasury
 Muir, the US Under-Secretary of State
 John Morrison, Mayor of San Francisco
 Bernard Hendrix, the Chief of the San Francisco Police
 Campbell, a captain of the San Francisco Police
 Cartland, a general in the US Army
 James Hagenbach, the chief of the FBI
 Jacobs, an assistant to Hagenbach
 Jensen, the deputy director of the FBI
 Isaacs, a doctor and the chief of the FBI's Drugs and Narcotics Section
 Kylenski, a doctor and a leading forensic expert, specializing in poisons
 Newson, an admiral in the US Navy and commander of their forces on the west coast
 Carter, a general in the US Army and commander of their forces on the west coast
 Boyann, a communications expert
 Pearson, the captain of a US Navy submarine
 Charles Rogers, a member of a US Army bomb disposal squad
 Carmody, a member of a US Army bomb disposal squad
 Hopkins, a driver of a flat truck
 Dougan, a journalist with Reuters
 Grafton, a journalist with the Associated Press
 Ferrers, a journalist
 Tony, a driver of a food delivery van

Background
The book was the first of three MacLean wrote set in California. MacLean said in 1976 it was "the best thing I've done."

Reception
The book was a best seller.

The Los Angeles Times thought Maclean was "going through the motions". The New York Times thought it was "nonsense, but agreeable nonsense... fun."

Proposed film version
In 1975 a film was going to be made by Warner Bros starring Charles Bronson and directed by J. Lee Thompson (who had directed a film based on MacLean's Guns of Navarone). However they could not find a script they were happy with.

In 1976 Maclean's second wife Mary formed a company with producer Peter Snell, Aleelle Productions, who aimed to make movies based on MacLean novels including Golden Gate, Bear Island, The Way to Dusty Death and Captain Cook.

Film rights were bought by Lew Grade's ITC, who announced in October 1977 that the film version would be part of a slate of films worth $97 million. Filming was to begin in February 1978 from a script by Marc Norman and directed by Jerry Jameson. However filming did not take place. In October 1978 ITC announced the film was one of their "contemplated productions." The film was never made.

References

External links
 Book review at AlistairMacLean.com

1976 British novels
Novels by Alistair MacLean
Novels set in San Francisco
William Collins, Sons books